676 Melitta is a minor planet orbiting the Sun. It is classified as a main belt asteroid. The name, Melitta, is the Attic Greek form of the name Melissa—a reference both to the nymph of ancient Greek mythology, and to the minor planet's discoverer, Melotte.

References

External links 
 
 

000676
Discoveries by Philibert Jacques Melotte
Named minor planets
000676
19090116